Kilimli can refer to:

 Kilimli
 Kilimli, Erzincan
 Kilimli, Narman
 Kilimli, Sason